The Grand Sweets and Snacks is a sweet shop and eatery chain based in the city of Chennai, India. It is famous for its sweet dish called Akkaravadasal which is distributed free-of-cost as prasadam to customers.

In 2010, the shop was partitioned into two businesses, following a family settlement. More branches were subsequently opened throughout Chennai.

References

External links 
 

1982 establishments in Tamil Nadu
Restaurants in Chennai
Confectionery companies of India